The Sabah order of precedence is a hierarchy of important positions within the state of Sabah, Malaysia. It has no legal standing but is used by ceremonial protocol. The order of precedence is determined by the State Order of Precedence issued by the Sabah Chief Minister's Department. The latest one was issued on 1 September 1996 with amendments entered into force on 3 October 2003. Unless otherwise noted, precedence among persons of equal rank is determined by seniority. As a general rule, spouses share the same rank with another and a person with two positions will take the highest one.

Details  
The following lists precedence of offices and their holders .

State-level ceremonies

Federal-level ceremonies

District-level ceremonies

See also 
 List of post-nominal letters (Sabah)
Order of Kinabalu

Footnotes

References 

Orders of precedence in Malaysia
Government of Sabah